This is a list of seasons played by Maccabi Tel Aviv Football Club in Israeli and European football, from 1928 (when the club joined the newly founded EIFA) to the most recent completed season. It details the club's achievements in major competitions, and the top scorers for each season. Top scorers in bold were also the top scorers in the Israeli league that season. Records of minor competitions such as the Lilian Cup are not included due to them being considered of less importance than the State Cup and the Toto Cup.

The club has won the League championship 23 times, the State Cup 24 times, the Toto Cup seven times and Asian Champion Club Tournament twice. The club has never been out of the top division of Israeli football.

History
Maccabi Tel Aviv Football Club was established in 1906 in the port city of Jaffa before relocating to the newly established Tel Aviv in 1909. In 1928 the club joined the EIFA and competed in its competitions ever since, winning its first cup in 1929 and league championship in 1936. The club represented Israel in the Asian Champion Club Tournament in 1969, and 1970, winning the title in both attempts. As Israel joined UEFA, in 1992, the club participated in UEFA tournaments, reaching the Champions League group stage in 2004–05 and 2015–16. In 2014–15, the club became the first club in Israel to win all three major domestic titles, the League Championship, the State Cup and the Toto Cup in one season.

Seasons

Key

 P = Played
 W = Games won
 D = Games drawn
 L = Games lost
 F = Goals for
 A = Goals against
 Pts = Points
 Pos = Final position

 Leumit = Liga Leumit (National League)
 Artzit = Liga Artzit (Nationwide League)
 Premier = Liga Al (Premier League)
 Pal. League = Palestine League

 F = Final
 Group = Group stage
 QF = Quarter-finals
 QR1 = First Qualifying Round
 QR2 = Second Qualifying Round
 QR3 = Third Qualifying Round
 QR4 = Fourth Qualifying Round
 RInt = Intermediate Round

 R1 = Round 1
 R2 = Round 2
 R3 = Round 3
 R4 = Round 4
 R5 = Round 5
 R6 = Round 6
 SF = Semi-finals

Notes

References

Maccabi Tel Aviv F.C.
 
Maccabi Tel Aviv
Hapoel